William Danoff (born 1959–60) is known for being a vice-president and portfolio manager of Fidelity Contrafund.  At US $129 billion, Contrafund is the largest actively managed stock or bond mutual fund run by one person.

Education and early career
Danoff has a degree in history from Harvard and an MBA from Wharton. First joining Fidelity as an analyst in 1986, Danoff trained under Peter Lynch, who managed Fidelity's Magellan Fund from obscurity in the 1970s to the world's largest mutual fund in the 1980s.

Fidelity Contrafund
William Danoff is the single manager of the Fidelity Investments' flagship mutual fund Contrafund. Contrafund is one of Fidelity's largest mutual funds holding over $129 billion in assets, making it the largest single-manager mutual fund in the world. Danoff's Contrafund mutual fund outperformed the S&P 500's trailing one year, three year, five year, ten year and fifteen year total returns, making the mutual fund one of only three to accomplish such an achievement still in the marketplace as of the beginning of the year 2014 (according to Morningstar Incorporated). As of July 2018, the fund has continued its outperformance over the S&P 500.

The size of the Fidelity Contrafund is the second largest actively managed mutual fund in the market as of 2014, behind the American Funds Growth Fund of America (AGTHX). The American Funds team managed about $138.9 Billion; about a quarter larger than Contrafund. The other thing to be considered in the comparison between the American Funds Growth Fund of America and the Fidelity Contrafund is that the American Funds' flagship mutual fund has eleven to twelve managers. Danoff said in an interview in the summer of 2013 to help explain his success - "Larger funds have a higher degree of difficulty. For me, it's the ability to make big bets — it's harder. My denominator is so big that it's not that easy to find really great stories at scale."

In 2015, Danoff's 25-year solo management became an issue of concern as Fidelity had not named a co-manager for Contrafund. Should Danoff retire or become incapacitated without a co-manager or succession plan, Contrafund might face major redemptions from shareholders and lose its position in many large retirement plans which typically require at least three years of manager tenure.

See also
 Fidelity Contrafund

References

Living people
American money managers
Harvard College alumni
Wharton School of the University of Pennsylvania alumni
1959 births